The following elections occurred in the year 1948.

Africa
 1948 Mauritian general election
 1948 South African general election
 1948 Southern Rhodesian general election

Asia
 1948 North Korean parliamentary election
 1948 Republic of China legislative election
 1948 Republic of China presidential election
 1948 Singaporean general election
 1948 South Korean general election

Europe
 1948 Czechoslovak presidential election
 1948 Finnish parliamentary election
 Germany: 1948 West Berlin state election
 1948 Irish general election
 1948 Italian general election
 1948 Luxembourgian legislative election
 Netherlands: general election
 1948 Swedish general election
 1948 Slovak parliamentary election

United Kingdom
 1948 Armagh by-election
 1948 Brigg by-election
 1948 Croydon North by-election
 1948 Edmonton by-election
 1948 Glasgow Camlachie by-election
 1948 Glasgow Gorbals by-election
 1948 Glasgow Hillhead by-election
 1948 Paisley by-election
 1948 Southwark Central by-election
 1948 Stirling and Falkirk by-election
 1948 Wigan by-election

North America
 1948 Guatemalan parliamentary election
 1948 Honduran general election
 1948 Panamanian general election

Canada
 1948 Alberta general election
 1948 Edmonton municipal election
 1948 Liberal Party of Canada leadership election
 1948 New Brunswick general election
 1948 Newfoundland referendums
 1948 Ontario general election
 1948 Ottawa municipal election
 1948 Quebec general election
 1948 Saskatchewan general election
 1948 Toronto municipal election

United States
 1948 United States presidential election
 1948 United States elections
 United States House of Representatives elections in California, 1948
 1948 Louisiana gubernatorial election
 1948 Maine gubernatorial election
 1948 Minnesota gubernatorial election
 United States House of Representatives elections in South Carolina, 1948
 1948 United States House of Representatives elections

United States Senate
 1948 United States Senate elections
 United States Senate election in Massachusetts, 1948
 United States Senate election in South Carolina, 1948

South America
 1948 Argentine legislative election
 1948 Argentine Constituent Assembly election

Oceania

Australia
 1948 Australian referendum
 1948 Tasmanian state election

See also
 :Category:1948 elections

1948
Elections